The 1952 World Table Tennis Championships – Corbillon Cup (women's team) was the 12th edition of the women's team championship. 

Japan won the gold medal after finishing with a 6–0 match record. Romania claimed the silver medal and England won the bronze medal.

Medalists

Final table

Chile withdrew from the tournament

See also
 List of World Table Tennis Championships medalists

References

-
1952 in women's table tennis